Renée Lucht (born 17 September 1998) is a German judoka.

She is the gold medallist of the 2021 Judo Grand Slam Baku in the +78 kg category.

References

External links
 

1998 births
Living people
German female judoka
Universiade medalists in judo
Universiade bronze medalists for Germany
Medalists at the 2019 Summer Universiade
21st-century German women